San Francesco is a Gothic-style, Roman Catholic church located in front of the square named after the church, in the historic center of Prato,  region of Tuscany, Italy. 

San Francesco’s church, in the homonym square (XII–XIV sec.), it is located in the nucleus of the Oldest City of Prato and an Important Place of Catholic worship and one of the first Franciscan Churches with his big convent built on the ground that was donated by the municipality to the friars minor only eight days after the canonization of the saint, in 1228.

History and architecture

Construction of the monastery on land donated to the friars minor began a few days after the canonization of the saint in 1228; construction of the present church began in 1281, next to the oratory of the monastery. The church was finished in 1331, among the first buildings in Prato built in brickwork instead of stone. The façade is divided in bichrome stripes in alberese and serpentinite with a central portal, and ends with a 15th-century triangular tympanum with a stucco frieze by Andrea Della Robbia, depicting the Stigmata of St Francis. The 18th-century bell-tower was designed by Antonio Benini (1799-1801).

Interior
In 1902, a restoration of the interiors stripped some of baroque decoration, aiming to leave only the earliest medieval decoration.

Among the artworks are the funerary monument of Geminiano Inghirami (c. 1460), attributed to Pasquino da Montepulciano, who also executed the small cyborium on the presbytery wall. Pasquino's style recalls the work of  Antonio Rossellino.

Next to a Renaissance pulpit in pietra serena is a 15th-century panel with Christ's Monogram, which was traditionally added to churches visited by San Bernardino; above the high altar is a 14th-century polychrome wooden Crucifix, donated by the merchant Francesco Datini (who was buried next to the altar). The latter's tomb in white marble (work of Niccolò di Pietro Lamberti, 1411–12) portrays him within an elaborated Gothic tabernacle.

Regnadori's Chapel
Through door below the choir, on the left of the presbytery, we can enter into the Chapel Regnadori, protruding from the side of the church. Completed in the first half of the fourteenth century, the ceiling has two cross vault with ribs; the wall to the left of the entrance is decorated with a cornice in pietra serena during  the late renaissance, with and arch on fluted pilasters, with that, we can access to another chapel coeval (of employers Spighi) demolished in 1903. The wall in front of the entrance retains traces of seventeenth century frescoes; and on the semipilaster is carved the family crest of the Regnadori  family (for which the chapel was named) . To the right is a lancet window and there while the neo-Gothic altar ciborium is  the Same that adorn one time an altar. Side of the altar there are niches with statues: on the left a “Ecce Homo” century in colored wax.

The Cloister

The cloister, dating to 1438–1440, features Ionic columns. It has several coat of arms from the 15th-19th centuries, and several frescoes: a lunette with the Madonna and Child and a tabernacle with the Madonna Enthroned and Saints from the early 14th century.

Migliorati's Chapel

The Chapter (or Migliorati's Chapel) was entirely frescoed around 1400 by Niccolò Gerini, with figures inspired by Giotto. The scenes  include a ruined Cricifixion, the Stories of St. Matthew and Stories of St. Anthony (the latter also damaged)  and, on the vault, the Evangelists.

Images gallery

References

Roman Catholic churches in Prato
Franciscan churches in Italy
San Francesco, Prato
San Francesco, Prato
Churches completed in 1331
1331 establishments in Europe
San Francesco, Prato
14th-century Roman Catholic church buildings in Italy
Gothic architecture in Tuscany